The 2022 ICF Canoe Sprint World Championships was held from August 3 to 7, 2022 in Dartmouth, Canada.

Canoe sprint

Medal table

Men
 Non-Olympic classes

Canoe

Kayak

Women
 Non-Olympic classes

Canoe

Kayak

Mixed
 Non-Olympic classes

Paracanoe

Medal table

Medal events
 Non-Paralympic classes

References

External links
Official website
ICF event site
2022 ICF Canoe Sprint and Paracanoe World Championships – Time Table & Results

ICF Canoe Sprint World Championships
World Championships
International sports competitions hosted by Canada
Sport in Dartmouth, Nova Scotia
ICF